Wild marigold is a common name for several plants and may refer to:

Calendula arvensis, native to central and southern Europe
Tagetes minuta, native to southern South America